Zedi is both a given name and a surname. Notable people with the surname include:

Zedi Feruzi (died 2015), Burundian politician
Zedi Ramadani (born 1985), Croatian footballer
Rudolf Zedi (born 1974), German footballer
Selemani Zedi (born 1965), Tanzanian politician
Albanian given names